Humberto Andrés Suazo Pontivo (born 10 May 1981), nicknamed Chupete (in English, Lollipop), is a Chilean professional footballer who plays as a striker for  Deportes La Serena. In 2006, he was awarded the IFFHS World's Top Goal Scorer. After winning the Apertura 2007 with Colo Colo, he moved to Liga MX club CF Monterrey, where he became the club's all-time top scorer as well as winning two Liga MX titles, and three CONCACAF Champions League titles. He returned to Colo-Colo in 2015 after seven years with Monterrey. 

According to his 2010 FIFA World Cup profile, Suazo was known for his "keen positional sense and ability to finish with either foot".

Youth years
At six years old, Suazo's father took him to play with Club Torino in his hometown of San Antonio. His father had made a name for himself playing with the same team.

In December 1995, Suazo tried out for Universidad Católica. In March of the following year he was part of the club's youth system. However, Suazo's time spent there was troubled. He did not like to practice and at any given chance he would leave the facilities and return to San Antonio. Suazo later admitted he wasted the opportunity the club gave him.

Club career

Early career
In 2000, Universidad Católica loaned Suazo out to Chilean second division, Ñublense. His professional debut came against Magallanes, the club he would later play for, and he scored his first goal. At the end of the year, he fractured his fibula and was sidelined for seven months. The injury also kept him out of the 2001 FIFA World Youth Championship. In 2000, he won the Milk Cup, an international youth football tournament held annually in Northern Ireland.

At the end of 2001, no longer part of Universidad Católica, Suazo played for Magallanes. He would go on to join his hometown club San Antonio Unido in 2002. In 2003, Suazo turned heads with his new club San Luis Quillota of the Chilean third division, when he scored 40 goals in one season.

The next two seasons Suazo would spend with Audax Italiano. In early 2004, Suazo suffered another major injury which kept him out for a significant amount of time. With Audax, Suazo scored 40 goals before being transferred to Colo-Colo.

Colo-Colo

Suazo began his career with Colo-Colo just in time for the Copa Libertadores 2006. Even though Colo-Colo exited the tournament early, Suazo showed his ability by scoring a hat-trick against Chivas de Guadalajara.

In the 2006 Apertura tournament in Chile, Suazo led all scorers with 14 goals in 33 games on the way to capturing Colo-Colo's 24th national championship.

Colo-Colo, with the help of Suazo's tournament-leading 10 goals in 12 games, reached the finals of Copa Sudamericana 2006. On the way to the finals, he netted a hat-trick against Gimnasia LP. Suazo dazzled fans and scouts alike throughout the tournament, which raised questions about him staying with the team in 2007. Teams such as Santos Laguna of Mexico and Calcio Catania of Italy were both rumored to be interested in the player. However, Colo-Colo put those rumors to rest when they bought the rest of Suazo's ownership from his former club, Audax, on 15 December 2006, for one million US dollars. Ten percent of that fee ($100,000) went to Suazo's pocket. The move also assured his services to the club until June 2007.

In the 2006 Clausura tournament final, Colo-Colo played again against Suazo's former team, Audax. Colo-Colo won the first leg 3–0, with Suazo scoring his thirteenth goal of the season, and the second leg 3–2, with Suazo scoring the first two goals .

In the 2007 Apertura tournament, Suazo finished as the leading goal scorer, also scoring in the final match against Palestino. His lone goal, coming in the 79th minute, gave Colo-Colo their 26th tournament win, cementing his place in Colo-Colo history.

Monterrey
After months of speculation over where Suazo would end up after his contract expired in June, Suazo was finally sold for $5 million to Mexican club, Monterrey. The fee paid by the Mexican team is one of the highest for a Chilean player coming out of Chile.

Suazo's performance during his first tournament wasn't what was expected (only three goals in twelve games) and combined with conflicts with teammates and coaches. It led to speculations that Suazo had been sold to Argentine club Independiente. However, the deal fell through once the Argentine club refused to pay $8 million for the transfer. On 4 January, Humberto called for a press conference, and in front of television cameras and news media, he acknowledged the fact that his performance and attitude wasn't positive during his first 6 months with the club, but that from now on, he was determined to change things. He was going to take responsibility for his actions and commit himself to work hard to achieve better results.

On 6 April, Suazo scored four goals against Veracruz, in his team's 7–2 victory. This feat is the most a player from Monterrey has achieved in one game (tied with Milton Carlos). In his second season at Monterrey, he ended up as top goalscorer of the Mexican tournament
with a total of 13 goals in 17 games. Suazo then scored 3 more goals in the playoffs, 1 in the quarter-final 1st leg against 
Chivas, and two more against Santos Laguna in the semifinals, though Monterrey was unable to
advance to the final. The next tournament was a pretty poor one for both Suazo and Monterrey, failing to advance to the playoffs.
During the following tournament, Clausura 2009, Suazo helped Monterrey achieve the quarter-finals where they lost against Puebla.
Suazo scored a goal in the 1st leg which Monterrey lost 3–1.

In the Apertura 2009 final, Suazo became a key player in the title. In the Final's
first leg, he gave an extraordinary game and helped Monterrey get back from a 3–1 loss at halftime in their home stadium to win 4–3, with
Suazo scoring 2 of the goals. In the 2nd leg, he made a pass for his colleague, Aldo de Nigris, and then scored a goal himself in injury
time to secure the title. Rayados won by an aggregate score of 6–4 against Cruz Azul, taking the championship.

Real Zaragoza
On 8 January 2010, he left Monterrey and signed for the Spanish club Real Zaragoza on a loan deal with an option for Zaragoza to buy Suazo for 10 million euros. He made his debut for Zaragoza in a 0–0 draw against Xerez at La Romareda stadium.

As of 20 May 2010, Suazo's card still belongs to Monterrey and its worth has been raised to $25 million, provided that Real Zaragoza does not make valid their option to buy his card at $14 million.

Return to Monterrey

Suazo made a surprise return to Monterrey for the Apertura 2010, after Zaragoza
decided not to pay for Suazo's card. In this tournament he exceeded all the expectations from fans and the media, scoring 10 goals in the tournament and giving Monterrey their fourth league title in December 2010, plus obtaining the 2010-11 CONCACAF Champions League against Real Salt Lake the following May, making Monterrey the CONCACAF representative in the 2011 FIFA Club World Cup, He followed this success by winning the 2011–12 CONCACAF Champions League for the second time in a row, defeating Santos Laguna. Monterrey had a respectable participation in the 2012 FIFA Club World Cup, where they finished in third place. Suazo along with Aldo de Nigris, Jose Basanta and rising star Jesus Manuel Corona would lead Rayados to a third straight CONCACAF title when they won the 2012–13 CONCACAF Champions League. He scored the 4th goal in the final against Santos Laguna in what was a rematch of last season's final. Rayados reached the semi-finals of the Clausura 2013 tournament but lost to Club America. Rayados finished in a disappointing 5th place at the 2013 FIFA Club World Cup, with the highlight being a 5–1 win against Al-Ahly which remains the biggest scoring margin in the history of the FIFA Club World Cup. The following year Monterrey had a forgettable Clausura 2014 season. They reached the semi-finals of the Apertura 2014 but lost 3–0 on aggregate against America in what would prove to be Suazo's final game for Rayados, finishing with a total of 121 goals in 252 appearances and six official titles

Later career
In 2015, he returned to Colo-Colo and announced his retirement from football on 14 January 2016. In 2017, however, he joined his former club San Antonio Unido, who were playing in the Segunda División. He left the club in early 2018 and returned in July 2019.

On 30 August 2021, Suazo returned to México and joined Raya2, the official reserve team of C.F. Monterrey. After participating in 10 games and scoring a goal, he left the team as announced in December 2021.

International career
Suazo had also become a fixture with his international side. In 2006, he scored 17 goals in national and international matches, surpassing Peter Crouch by one goal for the "World's Top Goal Scorer Award". His four international goals all came in friendlies. He scored goals against New Zealand and Sweden. His other two goals came in the form of penalties versus Ivory Coast and Colombia. In January 2007, he was awarded world's top goal scorer of 2006 by the International Federation of Football History & Statistics in Salzburg, Austria. He was also awarded the Silver Football as the world's second first league top scorer with 34 goals, behind Klaas-Jan Huntelaar from Ajax Amsterdam with 35 goals.

Suazo played for Chile in the Copa América 2007, scoring three goals, two in his first match against Ecuador, and one in the quarter final match against Brazil. He finished as CONMEBOL's top scorer of the 2010 FIFA World Cup qualification with 10 goals, one ahead of Brazilian striker Luís Fabiano.

Career statistics

Club

International

Scores and results list Chile's goal tally first, score column indicates score after each Suazo goal.

Honours

Club
Colo-Colo
Primera División de Chile: 2006-A, 2006-C, 2007-A, 2015-A
Copa Sudamericana runner-up: 2006

Monterrey
Liga MX: Apertura 2009, Apertura 2010
InterLiga: 2010
CONCACAF Champions League: 2010–11, 2011–12, 2012–13

Individual
Torneo Apertura (Chile) top scorer: 2006, 2007
Torneo Clausura (Mexico) top scorer: 2008
Copa Sudamericana top scorer: 2006
2010 FIFA World Cup qualification (CONMEBOL) top scorer (10 goals)
Primera División de México Apertura 2009 Liguilla: top scorer, tied with teammate Aldo de Nigris (4 Goals)
Primera División de México Apertura 2009: Balon de Oro for Best Player of the Tournament.
Apertura 2010: Balon de Oro for Best Player of the Tournament.
Apertura 2010: Best Striker of the Tournament
2011–12 CONCACAF Champions League top scorer (7 goals)

References

External links

1981 births
Living people
Chilean people of Basque descent
People from San Antonio, Chile
People from San Antonio Province
People from Valparaíso Region
Chilean footballers
Chilean expatriate footballers
Chile international footballers
Association football forwards
San Antonio Unido footballers
San Luis de Quillota footballers
Audax Italiano footballers
Colo-Colo footballers
C.F. Monterrey players
Real Zaragoza players
Deportes Santa Cruz footballers
Deportes La Serena footballers
Tercera División de Chile players
Chilean Primera División players
Liga MX players
La Liga players
Segunda División Profesional de Chile players
Primera B de Chile players
Liga de Expansión MX players
Chilean expatriate sportspeople in Spain
Chilean expatriate sportspeople in Mexico
Chilean expatriates in Mexico
Expatriate footballers in Mexico
Expatriate footballers in Spain
2007 Copa América players
2011 Copa América players
2010 FIFA World Cup players
Raya2 Expansión players